Ionactis caelestis, the Spring Mountain aster, is a rare North American species in the family Asteraceae. It has been found only in southern Nevada in the western United States.

Description
The plant usually produces several flower heads in a flat-topped array.

References

Astereae
Flora of Nevada
Plants described in 1992